Goynar Baksho ( The Jewellery Box) is a 2013 Bengali language Indian horror comedy film directed by Aparna Sen. The film is based on a novel Goynar Baksho and a short story Rashmonir Sonadana, both written by Shirshendu Mukhopadhyay and published in Desh magazine. The film premiered in Kolkata on 12 April 2013.

Plot 
The film revolved around women of three generations and their lives and changing position in society. And this is shown in relation to a jewellery box. The lead character is the matriarch of a Bengali Hindu family (Moushumi Chatterjee) of landed gentry in East Bengal. She was married off in an arranged marriage at age 11, and widowed shortly thereafter. The story of the film revolves around her wedding jewels, which she keeps sequestered in a box. After becoming a victim of ethnic cleansing during the partition of India, her family moves to the Republic of India from East Pakistan, losing their ancestral lands in the process. She spends the remainder of her life, apparently as a chaste widow, hiding her wedding jewels from her greedy relatives in the joint family. In 1949, she befriends the new bride of the family, her niece-in-law (Konkona Sen Sharma) shortly before dying.

The niece-in-law is visited by the spirit of the matriarch, who demands that she hide the jewelry box from her greedy relatives. Over the years, the family descends into poverty, losing money in judicial proceedings over family property disputes, while the niece in law, regularly monitored by the spirit of the matriarch, keeps the jewels hidden. Eventually, the spirit of the matriarch allows the niece-in-law to pawn some of the jewels so that her husband (Saswata Chatterjee) can set up a business, over the objections of the family, selling saris . The prosperity of the business allows her to buy the jewels back, completing the hidden collection. The niece-in-law discovers that her husband is having an extramarital affair, and complains to the ghost of the matriarch. The ghost of the matriarch regales her with a story of a torrid sexual liaison that she had with a labourer when she was alive and young, and encourages the niece in law to take on a lover of her own. The niece-in-law at first falls in love with the secret lover but later she returns to her husband and gives birth to a girl. The ghost failing to succeed in her endeavor of uniting the niece in law and her lover abandons the niece in law and begins to visit her daughter, the ghost's grandniece instead.

The final part of the film revolves around the daughter as she grows up (Srabanti Chatterjee) and becomes a modern Bengali Indian woman; going to college, driving, and becoming involved in politics. The film approaches the year 1971, when the Bangladesh Liberation War breaks out in East Pakistan. Bengalis in East Pakistan demand political, cultural and linguistic freedom from the intense and brutal oppression of Pakistan, and rebel against West Pakistan. The daughter's lover regularly crosses the border over to East Pakistan to aid the Mukti Bahini rebels in their struggle for freedom. The 1971 Bangladesh genocide becomes a backdrop of the film, and one of the rebels is murdered by a Pakistani death squad, following which the ghost of the matriarch advises the daughter to donate the jewels to the cause of the Mukti Bahini.

Production 
Aparna Sen thought to make this film in 1993. But, she was not getting the right production house to finance the film. That's why she had to delay the project so long. Sen told–
When I first read the book way back in 1993, I instantly decided to turn it into celluloid, but the delay was due to not getting the right production house to finance the film. Now finally it is happening.

Cast 
 Moushumi Chatterjee as Rashmoni / Pishima
 Konkona Sen Sharma as Somalata
 Srabanti Chatterjee as Chaitali / Young Rashmoni
 Saswata Chatterjee as Chandan
 Paran Bandopadhyay as Chandan's Father
 Aparajita Addya as Chandan's Sister in Law
 Pijush Ganguly as Chandan's Elder Brother
 Manasi Sinha as Chandan's Mother
 Kaushik Sen as Rafiq
 Koushik Roy as Banwarilal aka Benu/ Ram Khilawan
 Monu Mukhopadhyay as Chandan's Paternal Uncle
 Sudipta Chakraborty as Kamala 
 Pradip Mukherjee as Doctor
 Rudraneel Das

Tracklist

Awards and nominations

See also 
 Aborto
 Balukabela.com

References

External links
 
 Goynar Baksho at Disney+ Hotstar

Bengali-language Indian films
2010s Bengali-language films
2013 films
Films based on short fiction
Indian comedy horror films
2013 comedy horror films
Films based on Indian novels
Films based on works by Shirshendu Mukhopadhyay
Films directed by Aparna Sen
2013 comedy films
Films scored by Debojyoti Mishra